The Environmental Justice Atlas documented 3,100 environmental conflicts worldwide as of April 2020 and emphasised that many more conflicts remained undocumented.

Climate

 Global Climate March
 Global Day of Action
 March Against Monsanto
 March for Science (2017)
 People's Climate March (2014)
 People's Climate March (2017)
 School strike for climate / Fridays for Future (FFF) (2018-)
 September 2019 climate strikes
 Stop Climate Chaos
 Say Yes demonstrations
 March for Science Portland
 Camp for Climate Action

Mining

 Ashio Copper Mine
 Conflict minerals
 Cuajone mine
 Dolores mine
 Escobal mine protests
 Fenix Nickel Project
 Himpunan Hijau
 Kamoto mine
 Kenticha mine
 Las Bambas copper mine
 2015 Peruvian protests against Las Bambas mining project
 Lega Dembi mine
 Marikana massacre
 Mirador mine
 Mutanda mine
 Phosphorite War
 Tilwezembe mine
 Resolution Copper (Oak flat)
 Rio Tinto massacre
 Roșia Montană protests
 San Carlos Panantza mine
 Shifang protest
 Thacker Pass lithium mine
 Toroku arsenic disease
 Uranium mining on Navajo reservations
 2010 Xinfa aluminum plant protest
 Yanacocha gold mine

Fossil fuels

 Arun gas field
 Bayou Bridge Pipeline protests
 Coastal GasLink pipeline
 2020 Candainan pipeline and railway protests
 Dakota Access Pipeline protests
 Grassy Mountain Coal Project
 Hambach Forest
 Karachaganak Field
 Keystone pipeline
 Lago Agrio oil field
 Environmental issues in the Niger Delta
 Movement for the Survival of the Ogoni People
Stop Line 3 
 Trans Mountain pipeline

Timber and agriculture

 Indigenous rainforest blockades in Borneo
 Chipko movement
 Fairy Creek timber blockade
 Grassy Narrows road blockade
 Gurindji Strike
 Prey Lang Wildlife Sanctuary

Toxic waste

 Agbogbloshie
 Cancer Alley
 China PX protests
 Grassy Narrows mercury poisoning
 Electronic waste in Guiyu
 Four Big Pollution Diseases of Japan
 Jinkanpo Atsugi Incinerator
 2005 Huashui protest
 Kokuba River
 Love Canal protests
 Qidong protest
 Khian Sea waste disposal incident
 North Carolina PCB Protest, 1982

Urban development and infrastructure

 2011 Bolivian indigenous rights protests
 Gezi Park protests
 Green Bans
Hands off our Forest
Heathrow airport expansion
Homes before Roads
 List of road protests in the UK and Ireland
Oka Crisis 
Runway 18 West 
Stop Cop City

Dams and water conflicts
 Agua Zarca dam
 Chico River dam
 Flint water crisis
 Save Manapouri Campaign
 Plachimada Coca-Cola struggle
 Tipaimukh Dam

Nuclear 

 Anti-WAAhnsinns Festival (1980s)
 Nuclear industry in South Australia
 Kupa Piti Kungka Tjuta
 Nevada Desert Experience

Disasters 

 Bhopal disaster
 Hurricane Katrina
 San Juanico disaster

See also
 Anti-nuclear protests
 Environmental activism
 Environmental organisations
 Environmental racism
 List of environmental organizations

References

 
Protests
Protests
Environmental